Bileh Hu-ye Sofla (also Romanized as Bīleh Hū-ye Soflá) is a village in Qalkhani Rural District, Gahvareh District, Dalahu County, Kermanshah Province, Iran. At the 2006 census, its population was 58, in 11 families.

References 

Populated places in Dalahu County